Events from the year 1153 in Ireland.

Incumbents
High King: Toirdelbach Ua Conchobair

Events
 Devorgilla (married to Tiernan O'Rourke) eloped with Dermot McMurrough (the King of Leinster) to Ferns, an act which brought about a feud and McMurrough's eventual exile from Ireland.

Births
Cathal Crobhdearg Ua Conchobair, King of Connacht (died 1224).

Deaths